Hans van Dyk (born 29 April 1982) is a South African former professional rugby union player. His regular position was hooker.

Career

Van Dyk is a well-travelled player in South African domestic competition.

He joined  for a short spell during the 2012 Vodacom Cup before joining  for the 2012 Currie Cup First Division.

Towards the end of 2012, he played in his 150th first class match.

He is the older brother of  hooker BW van Dyk.

References

South African rugby union players
Living people
1982 births
Leopards (rugby union) players
Griquas (rugby union) players
Cheetahs (rugby union) players
Golden Lions players
Lions (United Rugby Championship) players
Pumas (Currie Cup) players
Boland Cavaliers players
SWD Eagles players
People from Bethal
Rugby union hookers
Rugby union players from Mpumalanga